Teck Lee LRT station is a closed and elevated Light Rail Transit (LRT) station on the Punggol LRT line West Loop in Punggol, Singapore, located in the middle of undeveloped forested areas just off Punggol Seventeenth Avenue. Future developments near the station include the future SIT campus in Punggol.

History

The station was completed like the rest of the stations on the Punggol LRT system in 2002. However, like many stations on the west loop, it remained closed after completion due to low development, and remains so today even after the opening of the west loop.

The station facilities were updated constantly, like the half height platform barriers and the information boards, with the exception of the MRT map.

References

External links

Punggol
LRT stations in Punggol
Railway stations in Punggol
Light Rail Transit (Singapore) stations